Banana spider may refer to:

 Cupiennius, a South and Central American genus of spiders
 Phoneutria, also known as Brazilian wandering spiders, a related South and Central American genus of extremely venomous spiders
 Golden silk orb-weaver (Nephila), a widespread genus of large but rather harmless spiders, noted for their large durable webs
 Argiope appensa, a black and yellow spider on several islands in the Western Pacific Ocean
 Trichonephila clavipes, a species of the genus Trichonephila indigenous to continental North and South America
 Banana spider myth, an urban legend regarding huntsman spiders

See also
Bannana, a genus of goblin spiders from China

Set index articles on spiders